The High Point Panthers baseball team represents High Point University, which is located in High Point, North Carolina. The Panthers are an NCAA Division I college baseball program that competes in the Big South Conference. They began competing in Division I in 2000 and joined the Big South Conference the same season.

The High Point Panthers play all home games on campus at George S. Erath Field. Over their 20 seasons in the Big South Conference, they have played in 17 Big South Tournaments, advancing to the finals in 2018 where they fell to top-seed Campbell.

Since the program's inception in 1933, three Panthers have gone on to play in Major League Baseball: infielder Dick Culler and relief pitchers Cody Allen and Jaime Schultz.

Conference membership history (Division I only) 
2000–present: Big South Conference

George S. Erath Field 

George S. Erath Field is a baseball stadium on the High Point campus in High Point, North Carolina that seats 550 people.

Head coaches (Division I only) 
Records taken from the 2019 High Point baseball media guide.

Year-by-year NCAA Division I results
Records taken from the 2019 High Point baseball media guide.

Awards and honors (Division I only)

 Over their 20 seasons in Division I, two Panthers have been named to an NCAA-recognized All-America team.
 Over their 20 seasons in the Big South Conference, 16 different Panthers have been named to the all-conference first-team.

All-Americans

Freshman First-Team All-Americans

Big South Conference Player of the Year

Big South Conference Coach of the Year

Big South Conference Rookie/Freshman of the Year

Taken from the 2019 High Point baseball media guide. Updated March 11, 2020.

Panthers in the Major Leagues

Taken from Baseball Reference. Updated March 11, 2020.

See also
List of NCAA Division I baseball programs

References